Angellie Sanoy (born February 15, 2001) is a Filipina child actress. 

She rose to stardom after playing the role of Narda (young darna) in the 2009 TV series Darna along with Marian Rivera and Regine Velasquez. On 2011, she played her very first lead role in the TV series Magic Palayok as Corazon "Cookie" De Leon along with Carla Abellana and Geoff Eigenmann. She won Best Actress for “Bomba” at the 33rd Warsaw International Film Festival in Poland.

Filmography

Television
Darna (2009) – young Narda
Magic Palayok (2011) – Corazon "Cookie" de Leon
Love You Stranger (2022) – Bunny

Movies
Dalaw (2010) – Belle
Patikul (2011)
Guni-Guni (2012) – Hazel
Homeless (2015)
The Bomb (2017)
Excuse Me Po (2018)
Ang Babaeng Allergic sa WiFi (2018) – Laurie
Mystery of The Night (2019)
Black Lipstick (2019)
Write About Love (2019)
Wild Little Love (2019)
Lockdown (2021)

References

External links

2001 births
Living people
Filipino child actresses
Filipino film actresses
Filipino television actresses
People from Davao City
Actresses from Davao del Sur
21st-century Filipino actresses

GMA Network personalities